Captain John Mason (1586–1635) was a sailor and colonist who was instrumental to the establishment of various settlements in colonial America. Born in 1586 at King's Lynn, Norfolk, and educated at Peterhouse, Cambridge. In 1610, he was appointed by James I to help reclaim the Hebrides. As a reward, he was granted exclusive fishing rights in the North Sea. This was ignored by the Dutch and he was treated as a pirate by the Scots. In 1615, he was arrested, but soon released after the seizure of his ship.  He was appointed the second Proprietary Governor of Newfoundland's Cuper's Cove colony in 1615, succeeding John Guy. Mason arrived on the island in 1616 and explored much of the territory. He compiled a map of the island and wrote and published a short tract (or "Discourse") of his findings.

Mason drew up a map of the island of Newfoundland. Published in William Vaughan's Cambrensium Caroleia in 1625, the map included previously established placenames as well as new ones such as Bristol's Hope and Butter Pots, near Renews. His tract entitled , was published in 1620 by Mason while in England.

In 1620 King James I's Privy Council issued Mason a commission and provided him with a ship to suppress piracy in Newfoundland. Mason ceased to be Cuper's Cove governor in 1621 and apparently he was not replaced, although the settlement continued to be occupied throughout the seventeenth century.

Upon returning to England, Mason consulted with Sir William Alexander about the possibility of establish settlements on Nova Scotia. In 1622, Mason and Sir Ferdinando Gorges received a land patent from the Plymouth Council for New England for all the territory lying between the Merrimack and Kennebec rivers. In 1629 they divided the grant along the Piscataqua River, with Mason receiving the southern portion. The colony was recharted as the Province of New Hampshire. It included most of the southeastern part of the current state of New Hampshire, as well as portions of present-day Massachusetts north of the Merrimack.

Although Mason never set foot in New England, he was appointed first vice-admiral of New England in 1635. He died that same year while preparing for his first voyage to the new colony.

References

External links 

 Government House The Governorship of Newfoundland and Labrador
 Biography at the Dictionary of Canadian Biography Online

1586 births
1635 deaths
People from King's Lynn
Governors of Newfoundland Colony
Alumni of Peterhouse, Cambridge
17th-century cartographers
Kingdom of England people in Newfoundland
Expatriates of the Kingdom of England in Scotland